Zulfikar "Zuko" Džumhur (24 September 1920 – 29 November 1989) was a prominent Bosnian writer, painter and caricaturist. His bohemian nature, versatility of a polymath and extremely creative personality have made him a unique figure of the Yugoslav culture in the second half of the 20th century.

Biography
Džumhur was born in Konjic, Kingdom of Serbs, Croats and Slovenes (modern-day Bosnia and Herzegovina). When he was only two months old his father, the ulama Abduselam Džumhur (1885–1933) and mother Vasvija (née Tufo; 1900–1978), moved to the capital of Belgrade, where his father got a job as the main imam of the Royal Yugoslav Army. Zuko Džumhur finished elementary school and the first four grades of high school in Belgrade, then moved to Sarajevo where he finished high school in 1939. Džumhur attended classes at the Law Faculty at the University of Belgrade, but soon left and later finished his studies at the Belgrade Academy of Arts in Petar Dobrović's class. During World War II, Džumhur's younger brother was killed in 1945.

Džumhur published his first caricatures in an army magazine in 1947, and very soon became one of the most prominent illustrators in Yugoslavia, publishing his caricatures in the country's best selling newspapers and magazines, such as Politika, Borba, Oslobođenje, Jež, NIN, Danas and many others. He published over 10,000 illustrations and caricatures, wrote numerous screenplays  and worked on the TV show Hodoljublje, which he hosted for over ten years on Sarajevo television.

In Belgrade during the seventies, Džumhur and other artists frequented the bohemian Skadarlija area of the old town. Zuko, along with other artists, was partly responsible for renovating and restoring the Tri šešira (Three Hats) cafe, a popular artist's hangout and a famous landmark in the street.

Džumhur published his first book in 1959, a travelogue entitled Nekrolog jednoj čaršiji (Obituary of a Small Town). Considered his best work, Nekrolog is also particularly exemplary of Džumhur's style of travel writing as a whole.  Moving freely, fluidly and often unexpectedly between the familiar and the remote, past and present, real and imagined, Džumhur's travelogues can be characterized by a certain mobility, fragmentariness and easy diversion. In the only preface he ever wrote, Ivo Andrić characterizes the writing in Nekrolog as similar to the illustrations with which Džumhur accompanies his text. 
 
And this line, firm and bare, begins with an unexpected point – running straight and solid, it seems to you it will go on in this direction forever, but somewhere it suddenly stops and unexpectedly pivots somewhere you never thought it would.

This fragmentedness is accompanied, and in some sense given shape by, a distinct focus on the physical world and its objects, and to the lived, material experience of a given place. Džumhur looks for the soul of a city in its objects, its "antiquities, churches, mosques, synagogues, graves of famous people, history in all its forms." In the first chapter of Nekrolog jednoj čaršiji, Džumhur treats the Bosnian town of Počitelj as a living subject, simultaneously recounts its long life as an important military strategic center as well as its humiliating physical deterioration and eventual historical irrelevance. He characterizes this as a death, at one point describing the city as experiencing a "shudder" that passed "through the dilapidated skeletons of old watchtowers and bastions, and blossomed in the guttered cobblestones of its dead alleyways." Grad Zelene Brade, or City of the Green Beard, is a reference to the tree-lined banks of the Neretva, which runs through the heart of the city. Džumhur later refers to the hands of the city's clock-tower as having long ago drowned in its "dark whirlpools...quickly and easily, like two severed hands of time," while at the end of the chapter the city itself is consumed in the "black whirlpools of the swollen Bogomil river - redundant and ridiculous/ in the tattered vests of forgotten old captains - crippled and starving!/...under a quilt of cherry blossoms - dim and dilapidated!/under the dead guards of dead empires..bareheaded, barehanded, barelegged and bare-boned." In the next chapter, Džumhur describes the thriving Juksek-Kaldrma neighborhood in Istanbul, then  Edirne, another city left "unpreserved and forgotten." Throughout the book, he describes small villages and urban centers in Bosnia and throughout the Anatolian Peninsula, all with a similar intensity and attention to physical detail, as well as with a focus on his own memories and personal encounters.

In the same way that Džumhur moves fluidly between places, his travel writing is also unique in its 
focus on the history of every place he visits and writes. Interwoven into his physical descriptions of a city are detailed accounts and stories about its past. The seamlessness with which these historical interludes are incorporated into vivid accounts of the lived experience of a particular place makes present the long-forgotten past, compounding history with the everyday. In Grad Zelene Brade, Džumhur describes, in parentheses, the city's entire history, from Hungarian rule under Matthius Corvinus, through 200 years of Ottoman rule, the Venetian conquer of Gabela and 40 years as part of the Austro-Hungarian empire. Džumhur's use of historical terminology and references to sometimes obscure past events and figures gives his writing a cultural specificity that makes it very difficult to translate. It has also led to characterizations of Džumhur's writing as anachronistic, or anti-modern, his "measuring of time and space as approximate, populist and old-fashioned, with a particularly cautious approach to modernity and its material and technological progress." This cautiousness, however  "reveals itself in an ironic and satirical light...his archaicness is concerned with life and technological innovation and not spiritual, aesthetic or literary modernism." It is perhaps this blend of the conservatism and modernism that allowed Džumhur to be described both as an "old-fashioned Muslim in the mold of Istanbul and Vienna" as well as a figure who in the 1950s helped cultivated Belgrade's distinctly liberal, Bohemian atmosphere.

Džumhur's popular television travel series Hodoljublja, directed by Mirza Idrizović, shares similar movement between familiar national landmarks and remote locales, between forgotten or insignificant towns and cultural-historical centers. As in Nekrolog, there is little difference in the style and intensity with which he engages with and describes the places he visits -  Džumhur thus "creates the illusion that the reader or viewer is at home everywhere." An attachment to the everyday in places both close at hand and far away expresses an ordinariness and a tolerance that distinguishes Džumhur from other travel writers, an ordinariness in which the reader can "catch a glimpse of something that might resembles the mimicry of the travel-writing subject, a kind of fusion of this subject with the environment in which it is located." This style also demonstrates Džumhur's particular expression of the relationship between East and West. Instead of positioning himself against the Eastern objects of his travel and description, Džumhur's travelogues describes the East from 'within,' as an experience lived out and lived through, as opposed to a distanced description of the other or a moral, or existential, fact.

Džumhur died in Herceg Novi aged 69 in 1989.

Bibliography
Nekrolog jednoj čaršiji (1958) (Obituary of a čaršija (the downtown/main street Ottoman-Turkish style bazaar)) (with an introduction by Ivo Andrić)Pisma iz Azije (1973) (Letters from Asia)Pisma iz Afrike i Evrope (Letters from Africa & Europe)Stogodišnje priče (Centennial tales)Putovanje bijelom Ladom (1982) (Voyage with white "Lada")Hodoljublja (1982, "TV Sarajevo" Bosnia and Herzegovina) (Travelogue - a travel documentary with focus on culture, traditions, art and nature of Bosnia and Herzegovina, (ex) Yugoslavia and countries he sojourned, primarily Islamic and countries of Mediterranean Basin.)AdakaleZelena čoja Montenegra'' (Green carpet of Montenegro - co-authored with Serbian novelist Momo Kapor)

References

1920 births
1989 deaths
People from Konjic
Bosniaks of Bosnia and Herzegovina
Bosnia and Herzegovina Muslims
Bosnia and Herzegovina writers
Bosniak writers
Yugoslav writers